The 1958 Baltimore Orioles season involved the Orioles finishing 6th in the American League with a record of 74 wins and 79 losses, 17.5 games behind the AL and World Series champion New York Yankees. The team was managed by Paul Richards, and played their home games at Baltimore's Memorial Stadium, which hosted the All-Star Game that season. During the 1958 season, Gus Triandos hit 30 home runs, setting a Baltimore Orioles franchise record (since broken) for most home runs in one season.

Offseason 
 March 24, 1958: Foster Castleman was purchased by the Orioles from the San Francisco Giants for $30,000.

Regular season 
On June 6, 1958, Orioles president James Keelty, Jr. reached agreement with Miami Marlins president George B. Storer to move the Orioles' spring training home from Scottsdale, Arizona to Miami Stadium for the 1959 spring training season.

On September 20, pitcher Hoyt Wilhelm struck out eight batters while throwing a no-hitter against the New York Yankees. It was the first no-hitter in Baltimore Orioles history, as Gus Triandos contributed a home run in the 1–0 win.

Season standings

Record vs. opponents

Notable transactions 
 May 16, 1958: Eddie Miksis was released by the Orioles.
 August 23, 1958: Hoyt Wilhelm was selected off waivers by the Orioles from the Cleveland Indians.

Roster

Player stats

Batting

Starters by position 
Note: Pos = Position; G = Games played; AB = At bats; H = Hits; Avg. = Batting average; HR = Home runs; RBI = Runs batted in

Other batters 
Note: G = Games played; AB = At bats; H = Hits; Avg. = Batting average; HR = Home runs; RBI = Runs batted in

Pitching

Starting pitchers 
Note: G = Games pitched; IP = Innings pitched; W = Wins; L = Losses; ERA = Earned run average; SO = Strikeouts

Other pitchers 
Note: G = Games pitched; IP = Innings pitched; W = Wins; L = Losses; ERA = Earned run average; SO = Strikeouts

Relief pitchers 
Note: G = Games pitched; W = Wins; L = Losses; SV = Saves; ERA = Earned run average; SO = Strikeouts

Farm system

Notes

References 

1958 Baltimore Orioles team page at Baseball Reference
1958 Baltimore Orioles season at baseball-almanac.com

Baltimore Orioles seasons
Baltimore Orioles season
1958 in sports in Maryland